Libraries is the second studio album by American musician The Love Language. It was released in July 2010 under Merge Records.

Track list

References

2010 albums
Merge Records albums
The Love Language albums